All Is Vanity is the second and final studio album by American singer and songwriter Christina Grimmie. It was released posthumously on June 9, 2017, through Republic Records and Universal Music Group. On the day of the release of Side B, the Grimmie family announced that they would release All Is Vanity.

The album was originally scheduled to be released on June 2, 2017, on National Gun Violence Awareness Day, but was then postponed to June 9, 2017, a day before the first anniversary of Grimmie's murder.

According to Billboard, the Grimmie family revealed that the songs on Side B would be featured on the album.

At some point this album as well as Side B was made unavailable on streaming platforms for unknown reasons.

Singles
"Invisible" serves as the album's lead single, released on February 17, 2017. Upon its release, it debuted at number 25 on the Billboard Twitter Top Tracks chart in the US. The music video was released on March 10, 2017.
"Sublime" is the second single from the album, released on the anniversary of Grimmie's death.

Track listing
All tracks produced by Stephen Rezza, except "I Only Miss You When I Breathe" produced by Steve Solomon.

Release history

References

2017 albums
Christina Grimmie albums
Republic Records albums
Albums published posthumously